Lieutenant-General George Middlemore  (died 18 November 1850, Tunbridge Wells) was a British Army officer and the first Governor of Saint Helena.

Originally commissioned in the 86th Regiment of Foot, he rose to command the 48th Regiment of Foot during the Peninsular War. He was the lieutenant-governor of Grenada from 1833 to 1835.

Middlemore was the first governor of Saint Helena from 1836 to 1842 after its handover from the British East India Company to the Crown.  He oversaw the repatriation of Napoleon's remains from there in 1840. He was succeeded on 6 January 1842 by Colonel Hamelin Trelawny.

Personal life
Middlemore married Phillis Sophia Lobb (died 15 July 1854, Southborough). They had 6 children:
Grace Phyllis (died 1892)
Robert Frederick Middlemore (died 18 October 1896, Thorngrove)
Helen Catherine
Jemina Honor (died 1887)
Mary Douglas (died 18 August 1853, Hastings)
Catherine Sophia

References

External links

 Google Books

|-

1850 deaths
Year of birth unknown
Governors of Saint Helena
48th Regiment of Foot officers
British Army generals
British Army personnel of the Napoleonic Wars
86th (Royal County Down) Regiment of Foot officers
Governors of British Grenada
British colonial governors and administrators in Africa